Autarotis is a genus of moths of the family Crambidae.

Species
Autarotis euryala Meyrick, 1886
Autarotis milvellus (Meyrick, 1879)
Autarotis polioleuca (Turner, 1911)

References

Crambinae
Crambidae genera
Taxa named by Edward Meyrick
Taxa described in 1886